Josef Dahmen (21 August 1903 – 18 January 1985) was a German stage, film and television actor.

Dahmen was married to the actress Gisela von Collande, with whom he had a daughter Andrea Dahmen. His granddaughter Julia Dahmen is also an actress. Dahmen had a vague resemblance to Hungarian actor Peter Lorre.

Selected filmography

 Wibbel the Tailor (1931) - Sohn des Wirts
 M (1931) - (uncredited)
 A Tremendously Rich Man (1932)
 The Hymn of Leuthen (1933) - Georg - Soldier
 The Lake Calls (1933) - Besatzung der 'Carola'
 Typhoon (1933) - Werkdetektiv
 The Testament of Dr. Mabuse (1933) 
 Refugees (1933) - Man with red hair
  (1934) - Müller, Chauffeur bei Sonnekamp
 Pappi (1934) - Fred
 Heinz in the Moon (1934) 
 Between Two Hearts (1934)
 Decoy (1934) - Bandit
 La Paloma. Ein Lied der Kameradschaft (1934)
 Love, Death and the Devil (1934) - Macco
 Don't Lose Heart, Suzanne! (1935) - Kurvenkarl
 Carmen Loura (1935) 
 Pygmalion (1935)
 Anschlag auf Schweda (1935) - Ein Bühnenarbeiter
 The Last Four on Santa Cruz (1936) - Cocteau
 Der müde Theodor (1936) - Felix Rieger
 The Traitor (1936) - Ein Helfer
 City of Anatol (1936) - Arbeiter bei Gregor
 Under Blazing Heavens (1936) - Polizeiarzt
 My Son the Minister (1937) - Ein revolutionärer Zwischenrufer
 Unternehmen Michael (1937) - Ein Defätist
 Manege (1937)
 Mother Song (1937) - Inspizient
 Urlaub auf Ehrenwort (1938) - Zweiter Gauner
 Grossalarm (1938)
 Capriccio (1938) - Brautwerber und Zechkumpane Barberousses
 Pour le Mérite (1938) - Zuschlag
 The Immortal Heart (1939) - Matrose
 Silvesternacht am Alexanderplatz (1939) - Anton Lingenfelder
 Salonwagen E 417 (1939) - Zimmerkellner im 'Deutschen Kaiser'
 Renate in the Quartet (1939) - Musiker am Konservatorium
 Sensationsprozess Casilla (1939) - Vergifteter Co-Pilot
 Legion Condor (1939) - Unteroffizier
 Above All Else in the World (1941) - Uffz. Weber
 Ohm Krüger (1941) - Englischer Soldat im Frauenkonzentrationslager
 Stukas (1941) - Feldwebel Traugott
 Sechs Tage Heimaturlaub (1941) - Chauffeur
 Menschen im Sturm (1941)
 Two in a Big City (1942) - Gesang (uncredited)
 Schicksal (1942) - Diener
 A Gust of Wind (1942) - Herr Galassi
 Die goldene Stadt (1942) - Ein Bauer
 Diesel (1942) - Maschinist bei Buz
 Ein glücklicher Mensch (1943)
 The Crew of the Dora (1943) - Feldwebel Otto Roggenkamp
 Gefährlicher Frühling (1943) - Dr. Oskar Neugefeldt
  (1944) - Feldwebel
 Kolberg (1945) - Franz
 Der Erbförster (1945)
 The Last Night (1949) - Rostard, Kellner
 Dreizehn unter einem Hut (1950) - Herr Fleischer
 Blondes for Export (1950) - Armand
 Harbour Melody (1950) - Barmixer
  (1950) - Hafenarbeiter
 The Rabanser Case (1950) - Herr Imhoff
 Third from the Right (1950) - Diener Josef
 The Lost One (1951) - Lieske, canteen bartender (uncredited)
 Kommen Sie am Ersten (1951) - Gregory
 Roses Bloom on the Moorland (1952) - Der schwedische Leutnant
 Shooting Stars (1952) - Eisenbahner
 Don't Forget Love (1953)
 Das singende Hotel (1953)
 Not Afraid of Big Animals (1953) - Schwerer Junge
 Eine Liebesgeschichte (1954)
 The Man of My Life (1954)
 Columbus Discovers Kraehwinkel (1954)
 They Were So Young (1954) - Dr. Perez
 Operation Sleeping Bag (1955) - Major Fercher
 Zwei blaue Augen (1955) - Professor Wittmann
 Die Ehe des Dr. med. Danwitz (1956) - Regierungsrat
  (1956) - Schlachtermeister Van Heusden
 A Heart Returns Home (1956) - Dr. Brandel
 Für zwei Groschen Zärtlichkeit (1957) - Paul Müller
 The Heart of St. Pauli (1957) - Polizeibeamter
 Heart Without Mercy (1958)
 Man in the River (1958) - Bergungsinspektor Garms
 The Girl from the Marsh Croft (1958) - Vater Nilsson
 The Muzzle (1958) - Bankier (uncredited)
 Thirteen Old Donkeys (1958) - Dr. Köster
 The Magliari (1959) - Herr Mayer
 The Buddenbrooks (1959) - Rektor Wulicke
 The Terrible People (1960) - Henker (uncredited)
  (1961) - Manager
 Treasure of the Silver Lake (1962) - Hartley (voice, uncredited)
  (1963, TV miniseries) - Edgar Tupper

References

Bibliography
 Youngkin, Stephen. The Lost One: A Life of Peter Lorre. University Press of Kentucky, 2005.

External links

1903 births
1985 deaths
German male film actors
German male television actors
20th-century German male actors